CIRH may refer to:

International Rink Hockey Committee
CIRH-FM, a radio station in Vancouver, British Columbia, Canada